Lewis Lee Montsma (born 25 April 1998) is a Dutch professional footballer who plays as a defender for League One club Lincoln City. He also works as a model.

Early life
Montsma’s mother is Swedish, making him eligible to play for Sweden internationally. He attended St Nicolaaslyceum alongside Matthijs de Ligt, where he regularly played football with him.

Career
He made his Eerste Divisie debut for FC Dordrecht on 31 August 2018 in a game against NEC, as a starter.

Lincoln City
On the 14 July 2020, Montsma joined English League One club Lincoln City on a three year contract, on a free transfer. He made his Lincoln City debut and scored his first Lincoln goal in the EFL Cup on 5 September 2020 against Crewe Alexandra. He would continue his goal scoring run, scoring in the second and third round of the EFL Cup against Bradford City and Liverpool. And his run of scoring would continue in the next game against Charlton Athletic, scoring his first goal in League One. On 8 January 2022, Lewis Montsma was injured against Oxford United, which was later confirmed as an ACL injury which would rule him out of action for up to 9 months. Following his surgery on his ACL, he would sign a new contract until the summer of 2024. Just over a year from his injury, Montsma returned to the squad on 28 January 2023 against Cambridge United.

Career statistics

Honours
Individual
PFA Team of the Year: 2020–21 League One

References

External links
 

1998 births
Living people
Footballers from Amsterdam
Dutch footballers
Association football defenders
FC Dordrecht players
Lincoln City F.C. players
Eerste Divisie players
English Football League players
Dutch expatriate footballers
Dutch expatriate sportspeople in England
Expatriate footballers in England